Capiz's at-large congressional district refers to the provincewide electoral district that was used to elect members of Philippine national legislatures in Capiz before 1987.

Capiz first elected its representatives at-large in the 1943 Philippine legislative election for a seat in the National Assembly of the Second Philippine Republic. Before 1943, the province which also included the territories of present-day Aklan and Romblon (until 1919) was represented in the national legislatures through its first, second and third districts. The province was also earlier represented in the Malolos Congress of the First Philippine Republic in 1898 by appointed delegates residing in Luzon.

The three districts were restored in Capiz ahead of the 1941 Philippine House of Representatives elections whose elected representatives only began to serve following the dissolution of the Second Republic and the restoration of the Philippine Commonwealth in 1945. The province lost its third district following the separation of Aklan in 1956. An at-large district would not be used in the province again until the 1984 Philippine parliamentary election for two seats in the Batasang Pambansa. It became obsolete following the 1987 reapportionment under a new constitution that restored Capiz's two congressional districts.

Representation history

See also
Legislative districts of Capiz

References

Former congressional districts of the Philippines
Politics of Capiz
1898 establishments in the Philippines
1901 disestablishments in the Philippines
1943 establishments in the Philippines
1944 disestablishments in the Philippines
1984 establishments in the Philippines
1986 disestablishments in the Philippines
At-large congressional districts of the Philippines
Congressional districts of Western Visayas
Constituencies established in 1898
Constituencies disestablished in 1901
Constituencies established in 1943
Constituencies established in 1984
Constituencies disestablished in 1986
Constituencies disestablished in 1944